Beacon Hill is an ice-covered, dome-shaped hill of elevation 1,810 m which rises 120 m above the surrounding plateau ice surface.  It is situated in the south part of Hemimont Plateau in Graham Land, Antarctica 2.5 mi northeast of McLeod Hill. The hill surmounts the divide between Northeast Glacier and Bills Gulch. It was surveyed and named by the U.S. Antarctic Service (USAS), 1939–41; the hill may have been the site of a beacon at that time. The U.S. Antarctic Service (USAS) operated a plateau weather station close southwestward (68°07' S, 66°30' W) of the hill throughout November and December 1940. The hill was further surveyed by the Falkland Islands Dependencies Survey from Stonington Island between 1946-50.

References 

Hills of Graham Land
Fallières Coast